is a passenger railway station located in the city of Nantan, Kyoto Prefecture, Japan, operated by West Japan Railway Company (JR West).

Lines

Station layout
The station consists of one ground-level side platform serving single bi-directional track. The station is unattended.

History
Shinkyū-Daigaku-mae Station opened on 16 March 1996.

Passenger statistics
In fiscal 2018, the station was used by an average of 714 passengers daily.

Surrounding area
 Meiji University of Integral Medicine, University Hospital

See also
List of railway stations in Japan

References

External links

 Station Official Site

Railway stations in Kyoto Prefecture
Sanin Main Line
Railway stations in Japan opened in 1996
Nantan, Kyoto